Darveniza is a surname. Notable people with the surname include:

Kaye Darveniza (born 1955), Australian politician
Paul Darveniza (born 1945), Australian rugby union player
Trojan Darveniza (1921–2015), Australian rules footballer